Kravets is a Ukrainian-language and Yiddish-language occupational surname meaning "tailor".

The surname may refer to:
Andriy Kravets (born 1990), Ukrainian Go player
Alla Kravets (born 1973), Ukrainian volleyball player
Artem Kravets (born 1989), Ukrainian footballer
Darya Kravets (born 1994), Ukrainian footballer
Inessa Kravets (born 1966), Ukrainian athlete
Jean-Jacques Kravetz (born 1947), French musician
Lyudmyla Kravets (1923–2015), Soviet-Ukrainian combat medic
Marina Kravets (born 1984), Russian actress and singer
Mikhail Kravets (born 1963), Russian ice hockey player
Olena Kravets (born 1977), Ukrainian actress and TV host
Torichan Kravets (1876–1955), Russian-Soviety physicist
Vasyl Kravets (born 1997), Ukrainian footballer
Volodymyr Kravets (1930–2011), Ukrainian diplomat
Volodymyr Kravets (born 1981), Ukrainian boxer

See also
 
 Kravitz, Krawiec, related surnames

Occupational surnames
Ukrainian-language surnames
Surnames of Ukrainian origin